Sanna Reetta Talonen (born 15 June 1984) is a retired Finnish football forward. She last played in the Swedish Damallsvenskan for KIF Örebro, a club she represented for seven seasons, scoring 54 league goals. She previously played for FC Ilves and FC Honka in Finland's Naisten Liiga and Florida Seminoles and Vancouver Whitecaps in United States' NCAA and W-League respectively.

International career
Talonen made her senior Finland women's national football team debut in March 2004 at a 4–0 defeat to China in the Algarve Cup. Her goalscoring exploits with FC Honka earned Talonen a place in the national squad for UEFA Women's Euro 2005 in North West England. She played in two matches as the Finns reached the semi-final.

At UEFA Women's Euro 2009 in Finland, Talonen featured in the hosts' attack. She was involved in a clash of heads with England's Faye White during Finland's 3–2 quarter-final defeat.

In June 2013 Talonen was named in national coach Andrée Jeglertz's Finland squad for UEFA Women's Euro 2013. At the tournament Talonen played as a centre forward, although she had been playing on the right wing for her club team.

References

External links
 
 
 
 

1984 births
Living people
Finnish women's footballers
Finland women's international footballers
Finnish expatriate footballers
Expatriate women's footballers in Sweden
Expatriate women's soccer players in Canada
Expatriate women's soccer players in the United States
Vancouver Whitecaps FC (women) players
USL W-League (1995–2015) players
KIF Örebro DFF players
Bälinge IF players
Damallsvenskan players
Florida State Seminoles women's soccer players
Kansallinen Liiga players
Helsingin Jalkapalloklubi (women) players
FC Honka (women) players
Finnish expatriate sportspeople in Sweden
Finnish expatriate sportspeople in Canada
Finnish expatriate sportspeople in the United States
Women's association football forwards
FIFA Century Club